The 417th Bombardment Squadron is a United States Army Air Forces unit.  Its last assignment was with the 25th Bombardment Group at Alamogordo Army Air Field, New Mexico where it was inactivated on 20 June 1944.

History
The squadron was established in September 1939 the 27th Reconnaissance Squadron (Long Range), a B-17 Flying Fortress reconnaissance squadron at Langley Field, Virginia.  The 27th deployed to Borinquen Field, Puerto Rico in November. On Puerto Rico, it was assigned to the 13th Composite Wing, and was redesignated as the 27th Reconnaissance Squadron (Heavy) on 20 November 1940. The unit performed a number of long-range missions down the Antilles Islands chain, including frequent trips to St. Croix.

After the Pearl Harbor Attack, elements were attached to the 25th and 40th Bombardment Groups.   On 16 February, the Squadron had been assigned to the Antilles Air Task Force.  "A" Flight of the Squadron was deployed to Camaguey Airfield, Cuba in April 1942, and a detachment was at Vernam Field, Jamaica.

On 7 May 1942, the squadron was redesignated as the 417th Bombardment Squadron (Medium) while attached to the 25th Bombardment Group and the squadron was heavily involved in antisubmarine sweeps in the waters around Cuba, the Windward Passage, and the Cayman Trench.

The squadron moved west on 24 September 1942 to Vernam Field, Jamaica, then moved to Losey Field, Puerto Rico, on 29 May 1943, where the long-standing attachment to the 25th Bombardment Group became an assignment. Detachments at different times operated from Borinquen Field, Puerto Rico; San Juan Naval Air Station, Puerto Rico; Guantanamo Bay NAS, Cuba; Camaguey Field, Cuba.  In August 1943, the Squadron received the North American B-25D Mitchell. The Squadron moved on 12 September, this time returning to Borinquen Field. The detachment at Camaguey Field, Cuba, was discontinued in August 1943. However, these crews were apparently moved to San Julián Field, Cuba,

By 31 December 1943 with the Navy taking over the antisubmarine mission, the squadron had become, essentially, an operational training unit. In April 1944 the squadron returned to the United States and was disbanded on 20 June. Many of the older veterans of the squadron had in fact departed for the U.S. and other war theaters as early as December 1943.

Lineage

 Constituted as the 27th Reconnaissance Squadron (Long Range) on 16 September 1939
 Activated on 16 September 1939
 Redesignated: 27th Reconnaissance Squadron (Heavy) on 1 November 1940
 Redesignated: 417th Bombardment Squadron (Heavy) on 22 April 1942
 Redesignated: 417th Bombardment Squadron (Medium) on 7 May 1942
 Disbanded on 20 June 1944.

Assignments
 Puerto Rican Department, 16 September 1939 (attached to 25th Bombardment Group after November 1940)
 Associated with: 1st Photographic Group, 10 Jun 1941 – 22 Apr 1942 (training)
 25th Bombardment Group: 25 February 1944 – 20 June 1944.

Stations
 Langley Field, Virginia, 16 September-17 November 1939
 Borinquen Field, Puerto Rico, 21 November 1939
 Detachment operated from: Camaguey Air Base, Cuba, 13 April 1942 – August 1943
 Vernam Field, Jamaica, 24 September 1942
 Losey Field, Puerto Rico, 29 May 1943 – 24 March 1944
 Alamogordo AAF, New Mexico, April 1944 – 20 June 1944.

Aircraft
 B-17 Flying Fortress, 1939
 B-18 Bolo, 1939–1944
 B-25 Mitchell, 1943–1944

References

Notes

Bibliography

 *

External links

Military units and formations established in 1939
Bombardment squadrons of the United States Army Air Forces